John Pilley, also known as Jane Anne Pilley, became the first prisoner in England and Wales to be granted sex reassignment surgery in 1999, following legal action. Pilley's case set a precedent for other transgender prisoners.  At the time, he identified as a transgender woman and was serving a life sentence for kidnapping a taxi driver in 1981. Before the operation, he underwent seven years of hormone-replacement treatment.

In 2006, he had another sex change operation, and was moved back to a men's prison.

References

Living people
British people convicted of kidnapping
People who detransitioned
Prisoners sentenced to life imprisonment by England and Wales
Year of birth missing (living people)
Transgender case law in the United Kingdom
1950s births